Clapham's Ferry, also known as Spinks Ferry, Lost Corner Farm, and Riverside, is a historic home located near Leesburg, Loudoun County, Virginia.  It consists of a -story, three bay, Federal style main block of red sandstone, with a two-story sandstone kitchen addition built about 1849. It has a standing seam metal gable roof. Also on the property are the contributing log kitchen building, meat house, bank barn, corn crib, and tenant house.  The property is also historically significant as the site of an early ferry crossing connecting Loudoun County, Virginia, with Maryland.

It was listed on the National Register of Historic Places in 1997.

References

Houses on the National Register of Historic Places in Virginia
Federal architecture in Virginia
Houses completed in 1849
Houses in Loudoun County, Virginia
National Register of Historic Places in Loudoun County, Virginia
1849 establishments in Virginia
Leesburg, Virginia